Daniel Bailey Ryall (January 30, 1798 – December 17, 1864) was an American Democratic Party politician who represented New Jersey on a general ticket in the United States House of Representatives for one term from 1839 to 1841.

Early life and education
He was born in Trenton, New Jersey where he completed preparatory studies. Later, he attended Trenton Academy. He studied law, was admitted to the bar in 1820, and commenced practice in Freehold Township, New Jersey.

Political career
Ryall was a member of the New Jersey General Assembly in 1831 and 1833–1835 and served as speaker 1833–1835.

Ryall was elected as a Democrat to the Twenty-sixth Congress, serving in office from March 4, 1839 to March 3, 1841.

After Congress
He resumed the practice of law. He died in Freehold, New Jersey in 1864 and was buried there in Maplewood Cemetery.

External links

Daniel Bailey Ryall at The Political Graveyard

1798 births
1864 deaths
Speakers of the New Jersey General Assembly
Democratic Party members of the New Jersey General Assembly
Democratic Party members of the United States House of Representatives from New Jersey
New Jersey lawyers
People from Monmouth County, New Jersey
Politicians from Trenton, New Jersey
19th-century American politicians
Burials at Maplewood Cemetery, Freehold, New Jersey
19th-century American lawyers